Anthony Williams (born 1822, date of death unknown) was a Union Navy sailor in the American Civil War and a recipient of the U.S. military's highest decoration, the Medal of Honor, for his actions during the Wilmington Campaign.

Born in 1822 in Plymouth, Massachusetts, Williams was living in Portsmouth, Maine, when he joined the Navy. For his actions during this period, he was awarded the Medal of Honor months later, on June 22, 1865.

Williams' official Medal of Honor citation reads:
Served as sailmaker's mate on board the U.S.S. Pontoosuc during the capture of Fort Fisher and Wilmington, 24 December 1864 to 22 February 1865. Carrying out his duties faithfully throughout this period, Williams was recommended for gallantry and skill and for his cool courage while under the fire of the enemy throughout these various actions.

References 

1822 births
Year of death missing
People from Plymouth, Massachusetts
People of Massachusetts in the American Civil War
Union Navy sailors
United States Navy Medal of Honor recipients
American Civil War recipients of the Medal of Honor